NGC 67 is an elliptical galaxy located in the constellation Andromeda that was discovered on October 7, 1855, by R. J. Mitchell, who described it as "extremely faint, very small, round". The galaxy belongs to the NGC 68 group, which also contains the galaxies NGC 68, NGC 69, NGC 70, NGC 71, NGC 72, and possibly NGC 74.

Target galaxy controversy
Mitchell's position locates the observed galaxy between an E3 elliptical and an E5 elliptical on the edge of the galaxy group, and each elliptical has been interpreted as the original and secondary. Wikisky lists the round galaxy as the primary and the elongated as PGC 138159, the Deep-Sky Objects browser lists the elongated as NGC 67, NED lists the same galaxy as both NGC 67 and NGC 67a. Courtney Seligman's NGC object database argues, however, that since the location offset of NGC 67 is similar to that of the other galaxies in the group, that the elongated galaxy is likely the observed object, and that the rounder NGC 67a was listed as a star by Mitchell.

References

External links
 

0067
01185
Elliptical galaxies
18551007
Andromeda (constellation)